Middleton was a county constituency in the county of Lancashire of the House of Commons for the Parliament of the United Kingdom. Created by the Redistribution of Seats Act 1885, it was represented by one Member of Parliament. The constituency was abolished in 1918.

Members of Parliament

Boundaries

The Redistribution of Seats Act 1885 provided that the constituency was to consist of "The Sessional Division of Middleton (except so much of the Parish of Spotland as is included in Division No. 10 as herein described, or in the Municipal Borough of Bacup), the Municipal Borough of Rochdale, and the Parishes of Alkrington and Tonge, and in the Sessional Division of Bury so much of the Parish of Hopwood as is not included in the Municipal Borough of Heywood."

Elections

Elections in the 1880s

Elections in the 1890s 

Fielden's death caused a by-election.

Elections in the 1900s

Elections in the 1910s 

Adkins was appointed Recorder of Nottingham and required to seek re-election.

General Election 1914–15:

Another General Election was required to take place before the end of 1915. The political parties had been making preparations for an election to take place and by the July 1914, the following candidates had been selected; 
Liberal: Ryland Adkins
Unionist: Bernard Townroe

References

Parliamentary constituencies in North West England (historic)
Constituencies of the Parliament of the United Kingdom established in 1885
Constituencies of the Parliament of the United Kingdom disestablished in 1918
Politics of the Metropolitan Borough of Rochdale
Middleton, Greater Manchester